The women's heptathlon event at the 2018 Asian Games was held at the Gelora Bung Karno Stadium, Jakarta, Indonesia on 28–29 August.  The event was won by Swapna Barman from India.

Schedule
All times are Western Indonesia Time (UTC+07:00)

Records

Results
Legend
DNF — Did not finish
DNS — Did not start
NM — No mark

100 metres hurdles
 Wind – Heat 1: +1.2 m/s
 Wind – Heat 2: −0.1 m/s

High jump

Shot put

200 metres
 Wind – Heat 1: −0.5 m/s
 Wind – Heat 2: −0.1 m/s

Long jump

Javelin throw

800 metres

Summary

References

Heptathlon
2018 women